The Logan Coalfield is a coalfield located in Logan County and Wyoming County of southern West Virginia, in the Appalachia region of the eastern United States.

It is part of the National Coal Heritage Area. Coal is still mined from the Logan Coalfield, but it is no longer one of the top producing coalfields in West Virginia.

History
The coalfield has been a large source of high-quality, high-volatile bituminous coal since the field was opened by the construction of the Chesapeake & Ohio Railway (C&O) in 1905.  The C&O maintained a rail yard in the district at Peach Creek.  Later the Virginian Railway built the "Gilbert Extension" which allowed the shipment of coal from western Wyoming County.  Both steam coal and metallurgical coal have been extracted from such seams as the Cedar Grove, Eagle, Alma, and Winifrede.

The coalfield is primarily drained by the Guyandotte River, and there were mines, such as Earling, Lyburn, and Marianna in this main river valley.  There has also been heavy mining in tributary hollows of the Guyandotte, such as Island Creek, Snap Creek, Rum Creek, and Buffalo Creek.  Most coal mining in the Logan Coalfield has been south of the town of Logan, but there were a few coal mines north of Logan and into Lincoln County as well.

This coalfield is somewhat infamous for a couple of reasons.  The sheriff of Logan County in the 1920s, Don Chafin, was allegedly paid handsomely by the coal companies to keep the United Mine Workers union out of Logan County, and he and his deputies brutally performed this task in such a thorough manner that the union could gain no foothold at all.  In 1921 a "coal miners' army" pitched a battle with Chafin and his "army" of deputies and mine guards at the Battle of Blair Mountain, a skirmish in which it could be said that the miners lost.

Disasters
Another cause for infamy in the Logan Coalfield was the Buffalo Creek Flood, when a Pittston Coal Company coal refuse dam burst in 1972.  It resulted in the death of 125 people, the destruction of about a dozen towns, and is one of the worst coal mining-related disasters in American history.  In 2008 a new coal mine and preparation plant opened at the site of the Pittston refuse dam.

More recently the Massey Energy Bandmill preparation plant had a fire in August 2009, resulting in the closure of the plant.  This plant processed coal from several mines, including the Aracoma Mine, where two miners lost their lives in a beltline fire, known as the Aracoma Alma Mine accident, in 2006.

See also

References

External links 
Coalfields of the Appalachian Mountains - Logan Field

 
Coal mining in Appalachia
Coal mining regions in the United States
Mining in West Virginia
Logan County, West Virginia
National Coal Heritage Area
Protected areas of Logan County, West Virginia